San Giovanni Evangelista is a church in Ravenna, Italy.

It was built in the fifth century AD by the Roman imperial princess Galla Placidia.

In the Middle Ages the Benedictines annexed to it an important monastery. In the 14th century both the church and the monastery were renovated in the Gothic style: of that intervention the portal is visible today. In 1747 the church was almost entirely stripped of its mosaics; the only remaining are two fragments of the original 5th-century floor, with the first recorded Christian use of hooked crosses. Other mosaic fragments found under the bombs belong to 13th-century floor and depict the Fourth Crusade. Two of the four bells dates 1208.

Heavily bombed during World War II, the building  was later restored.

References

External links

Palaeo-Christian architecture in Ravenna
Roman Catholic churches in Ravenna
Gothic architecture in Emilia-Romagna